Dracontium spruceanum is a tropical flowering plant species of the Amazon rainforest understory. It has been found in the South American countries of Colombia, Ecuador, Peru, Suriname, and Venezuela, as well as in the Central American countries of Costa Rica and Panama.

Common names for Dracontium sp. include jergón sacha (or sacha jergon), fer-de-lance, hierba del jergon, erva-jararaca, jararaca, jararaca-taia, milho-de-cobra, and taja-de-cobra.

Guang Hua Zhu identified two varieties of the species: Dracontium spruceanum var. asperispathum and Dracontium spruceanum var. grandispathum.

References

External links
Holotype of Dracontium loretense K. Krause at JSTOR Global Plants. Retrieved 21 June 2013.

spruceanum
Flora of the Amazon
Flora of South America
Flora of Central America
Plants described in 1858